The 2016 Toray Pan Pacific Open was a women's tennis tournament played on outdoor hard courts. It was the 33rd edition of the Pan Pacific Open, and part of the Premier Series of the 2016 WTA Tour. It took place at the Ariake Coliseum in Tokyo, Japan, on 19–25 September 2016. Caroline Wozniacki won the singles title.

Points and prize money

Point distribution

Prize money

Singles main-draw entrants

Seeds

 Rankings are as of September 12, 2016

Other entrants
The following players received wild cards into the main singles draw:
  Madison Keys 
  Petra Kvitová
  Naomi Osaka
  Olesya Pervushina

The following players received entry from the singles qualifying draw:
  Kateryna Bondarenko 
  Magda Linette 
  Aliaksandra Sasnovich 
  Varatchaya Wongteanchai

Withdrawals
Before the tournament
  Simona Halep → replaced by  Caroline Wozniacki
  Samantha Stosur → replaced by  Madison Brengle
  Sloane Stephens → replaced by  Anastasija Sevastova
  Daria Gavrilova → replaced by  Varvara Lepchenko

Doubles main-draw entrants

Seeds

 Rankings are as of September 12, 2016

Other entrants 
The following pairs received entry as alternates:
  Madison Brengle /  Kanae Hisami
  Lee Ya-hsuan /  Kotomi Takahata

Withdrawals 
Before the tournament
  Andrea Petkovic (lower back injury)
  Lucie Šafářová (right abdominal injury)

Champions

Singles

  Caroline Wozniacki def.  Naomi Osaka, 7–5, 6–3

Doubles

  Sania Mirza /  Barbora Strýcová def.  Liang Chen /  Yang Zhaoxuan, 6–1, 6–1

References

External links 
 

2016 WTA Tour
2016
2016 in Japanese women's sport
2016 in Japanese tennis
September 2016 sports events in Japan